Helene Thomas Bennett (July 5, 1901 – April 27, 1988) was a bacteriologist and businesswoman who worked in Arizona. She opened the Yuma Clinical Laboratory in 1926, in Yuma, Arizona, which became the second largest medical laboratory in Arizona. She was posthumously inducted into the Arizona Women's Hall of Fame in 2011.

Biography
Helene Alberta Thomas was born near Raton, New Mexico and was the eldest of three children of John Bertie Thomas and Catherine Helen (Wendell) Thomas.
 Her  father was the engineer on the Atchison, Topeka and Santa Fe Railway. When her father was killed in a railroad accident, her family moved to Kansas and later Jasper, Missouri. She received a degree in chemistry from the University of Kansas in 1922, followed by a master's degree in bacteriology. In  1926 she came to Yuma and established the Thomas Laboratory. She also have a laboratory at El Centro, California.

In 1926 she married attorney Ray Crawford Bennett with whom she had three children. She was widowed in 1944.

References

External links
Helene Thomas Bennett Collection Yuma County Library District 

1901 births
1988 deaths
20th-century American women physicians
20th-century American physicians
American health care businesspeople
20th-century American businesspeople
20th-century American businesswomen
Businesspeople from Arizona
Businesspeople from Kansas
Businesspeople from New Mexico
University of Kansas alumni
People from Raton, New Mexico